The  is a railway line in Ishikawa Prefecture, Japan, operated by West Japan Railway Company (JR West) and the Noto Railway. It runs between Tsubata Station in Tsubata and Anamizu Station in Anamizu.

The section between Wakuraonsen and Nanao is served by both companies. A further section of the line between Anamizu and  closed in 2001.

Prior to the transfer of the Wakuraonsen — Wajima section from JR West to Noto Railway in 1991, Noto Railway took control of another former Japanese National Railways (JNR) line in 1988, the Noto Line. It closed in 2005.

In 2015, the IR Ishikawa Railway took over the Hokuriku Main Line at Tsubata, effectively isolating the Nanao Line from the rest of the JR network; however, all JR West Nanao Line services continue to run through into the IR Ishikawa Railway to terminate at Kanazawa.

JR West
JR West owns the entire Nanao Line between Tsubata and Anamizu, but it only operates the southern section while Noto Railway operates the rest of the line.

Nearly all local and rapid trains run between Nanao and Kanazawa or Komatsu. Between Nanao and Anamizu, only Noto Railway operates local trains.

The JR section is electrified and operates both local and limited express trains. JR West also operates the Hanayome Noren excursion train from Kanazawa to Wakuraonsen Station.

Basic data
Operators, distances: 
West Japan Railway Company (Tracks)
Tsubata — Anamizu: 
West Japan Railway Company (Services)
Tsubata — Wakuraonsen: 
Noto Railway (Services)
Nanao — Wakuraonsen: 
Stations: 20
Tracks: Entire line single-tracked
Electrification: Tsubata — Wakuraonsen (1,500 V DC)
Railway signalling:
Tsubata — Wakuraonsen: Simplified automatic

Stations
The Nanao Line is entirely within Ishikawa Prefecture.

Rapid trains stop at stations marked with a "●". All rapid trains pass stations marked "｜".

Rolling stock

Electric
681 series (JR West)
683 series (JR West)
521-100 series (JR West and IR Ishikawa Railway) (from 3 October 2020)

Diesel
KiHa 48 (JR West) (Hanayome Noren)
NT 200 series (Noto Railway) (Nanao - Wakuraonsen)
NT 300 series (Noto Railway) (Nanao - Wakuraonsen)

Noto Railway

The Noto Railway section is not electrified (except for the section shared with JR West) and operates local trains only. Between Nanao and Anamizu, only Noto Railway operates local trains; there is no through service to the JR West-operated part of the line south of Nanao. 

In addition,  which is a tourist train, has been run on holidays since 2017. The trains stop at all stations and seats can be reserved for 500 yen. There are also dining cars on partly services.

Basic data
Operators, distances: 
West Japan Railway Company (Tracks)
Tsubata — Anamizu: 
Noto Railway (Services)
Nanao — Anamizu: 
Stations: 8
Tracks: Entire line single-tracked
Electrification: Nanao — Wakuraonsen (1,500 V DC)
Railway signalling:
Nanao — Anamizu: Simplified automatic

Stations
The Nanao Line is entirely within Ishikawa Prefecture.

History
The terminal in Tsubata was moved to the present Tsubata Station on August 2, 1900, and connected to the government-owned Hokuriku Main Line. Nanao Railway was nationalized on September 1, 1907.

The line was extended and had been operated by the Japanese Government Railways. In 1925, the Nanao to Wakura (now Wakuraonsen) section opened, and in 1935 the line was completed with the opening of the Anamizu to Wajima section. In 1991, the Nanao Line was electrified to Wakuraonsen, enabling through operation of trains from the Hokuriku Main Line. Operation of the Nanao to Wajima section was transferred to the Noto Railway. In 2001, the section between Anamizu and Wajima was closed.

See also
 List of railway companies in Japan
 List of railway lines in Japan

References

External links 
 Noto Railway official website 

 
Railway lines in Japan
Rail transport in Ishikawa Prefecture
Lines of West Japan Railway Company
Railway lines opened in 1898
1067 mm gauge railways in Japan
Japanese third-sector railway lines